Robert Lightfoot may refer to:
 Robert Lightfoot (priest) (1883–1953),  Anglican priest and theologian
 Robert Lightfoot (speedway rider) (born 1963), British former speedway rider
 Robert M. Lightfoot Jr. (born 1963), acting administrator of the National Aeronautics and Space Administration (NASA)